Nitrate reductase (NADH) (assimilatory nitrate reductase, NADH-nitrate reductase, NADH-dependent nitrate reductase, assimilatory NADH: nitrate reductase, nitrate reductase (NADH2), NADH2:nitrate oxidoreductase) is an enzyme with systematic name nitrite:NAD+ oxidoreductase. This enzyme catalyzes the following chemical reaction

 nitrite + NAD+ + H2O  nitrate + NADH + H+

Nitrate reductase is an iron-sulfur molybdenum flavoprotein.

References

External links 
 

EC 1.7.1